Llandarcy Halt railway station served the village of Llandarcy, in the historical county of Glamorganshire, Wales, from 1924 to 1947 on the Swansea District Line.

History 
The station was opened on 22 September 1924 by the Great Western Railway. It closed on 4 October 1947.

References 

Disused railway stations in Neath Port Talbot
Former Great Western Railway stations
Railway stations in Great Britain opened in 1924
Railway stations in Great Britain closed in 1947
1924 establishments in Wales
1947 disestablishments in Wales